Prometopinae is a subfamily of sap-feeding beetles in the family Nitidulidae. There are about eight genera in Prometopinae, including one North American genus, Prometopia.

References

Further reading

 
 
 
 
 
 
 
 
 
 
 
 
 

Nitidulidae